Bartley is a family name and a given name. Notable people with the name include:

Surname
Barrington Bartley (born 1980), Jamaican-American cricketer
Charles Bartley (1921–1996), American scientist
David M. Bartley (born 1935), American politician and educator
Dick Bartley (born 1951), American radio disc jockey active 1969–2016
Edward Bartley (1839–1919), New Zealand architect
Ephesians Bartley (born 1969), American football player
Frank Bartley (born 1994), American basketball player for Ironi Ness Ziona of the Israeli Basketball Premier League
Geoff Bartley (born 1948), American singer/songwriter active 1969–present
George Bartley (1782?–1858), English comedic actor
Jonathan Bartley (born 1971), English politician
Gerald Bartley (1898–1974), Irish politician
John Bartley (born 1947), American cinematographer
Kace Bartley (born 1997), English squash player
Kyle Bartley (born 1991), English footballer
Leonard Bartley (born 1971), Jamaican musician known as Merciless
Les Bartley (1954–2005), Canadian lacrosse coach
Luella Bartley (born 1974), English fashion designer and editor
Mordecai Bartley (1783–1870), American politician
Patrick Bartley (1909–1956), British civil servant and politician
Rook Bartley, fictional character in the science fiction franchise Robotech
Robert L. Bartley (1937–2003), American editor
Thomas Bartley (disambiguation), several people
William Bartley (politician) (1801–1885), lawyer in South Australia
William Warren Bartley (1934–1990), American philosopher and author

Given name
Bartley Campbell (1843–1888), American playwright
Bartley Crum (1900–1959), American lawyer
Bartley Fahey (1836–1920), a member of the Queensland Legislative Council
Bartley Christopher Frueh (born 1963), American clinical psychologist 
Bartley Gorman (1944–2002), British Romani bare-knuckles boxing champion
Bartley P. Griffith (* 1949), American heart surgeon
Bartley Powell (1920–1977), British graphic designer
Bartley Wilson (1870–1954), English artist